Marca Leyenda (Marca legend) is an award given by the Spanish sports newspaper Marca to the best sport professionals in history. Since its inception in 1997 over 80 people have received this award.

List of winners

References

External links
Official website

Spanish awards